Lyall Meyer (born 23 March 1982) is a South African cricketer and hockey player.

Meyer was a fast bowler for the Warriors and Eastern Province cricket teams in South Africa from 2001 to 2013, taking 122 wickets in first-class cricket at an average of 32.78. He also represented South Africa at hockey against France in 2005.

References

External links
 
 

1982 births
Living people
Cricketers from Port Elizabeth
South African male field hockey players
Warriors cricketers
Eastern Province cricketers
South African cricketers